Archontophoenix cunninghamiana (Bangalow palm, king palm, Illawara palm, piccabben, piccabeen) is an Australian palm. It can grow over 20 m tall. Its flower colour is violet and the red fruits are attractive to birds. It flowers in midsummer and has evergreen foliage.

The piccabeen palm grows in the wet subtropics on the sides of Mt Warning Volcano in northern NSW and over the border in Queensland's Lamington National Park, for example. It seeks a stable water supply so ravines and grottos are well populated. Its fronds do not create a nesting environment for insects or macrofauna like rodents, so are a tolerable tree for urban environments. They arrived in Australia from the landbridge created 45,000 years ago due to the receding ocean levels during the last glacial period, but the probable 'native' environment in prehistory was Indonesia.

It has become a noxious weed in many areas where it has been used as an ornamental plant.
In southern Brazil, it has become an invasive species, profiting from the local extinction of the endangered native palm Euterpe edulis.  In New Zealand, A. cunninghamiana could invade native forests, since it has the same ecological requirements as the native nikau palm. The Auckland Regional Council has included A. cunninghamiana on a list of plants requiring further research on their potential to adversely affect the environment.

In the United States, the palm is commonly cultivated in California from San Luis Obispo south to the Mexican border and in much of central and southern Florida.

References

Christiani, Alexander V. - "Fecundity, dispersal, and predation of seeds of Archontophoenix cunninghamiana H. Wendl & Drude, an invasive palm in the Atlantic Forest". Revista Brasileira de Botânica, V.29, no.4, October/December 2006 Portuguese & English abstracts.

Frisch, J.D. & Frisch, C.D. - Aves Brasileiras e plantas que as atraem [Brazilian birds and plants which attract them]: 2005, São Paulo, Dalgas Ecotec, 

cunninghamiana
Palms of Australia
Flora of Queensland
Flora of New South Wales
Trees of Australia
Ornamental trees
Taxa named by Carl Georg Oscar Drude